Ommatochila is a genus of moths of the family Erebidae. The genus was erected by Arthur Gardiner Butler in 1894.

Taxonomy
Ommatochila has previously been classified in the subfamily Phytometrinae within Erebidae or in the subfamily Acontiinae of the family Noctuidae. The genus is sometimes considered to be a synonym of Abacena.

Species
Ommatochila chorrera Schaus, 1916 Panama
Ommatochila crassipalpis Schaus, 1916 Venezuela
Ommatochila mundula (Zeller, 1872) southern US to Argentina, Antilles
Ommatochila plumbealis (Walker, [1866]) Amazonas in Brazil
Ommatochila santucca Schaus, 1916 French Guiana
Ommatochila stenula Schaus, 1916 Venezuela

References

Boletobiinae
Noctuoidea genera